Hurricane Linda was a very powerful Category 5 hurricane that was also the second-most intense eastern Pacific hurricane on record, but surpassed 18 years later by Patricia. Forming from a tropical wave on September 9, 1997, Linda steadily intensified and reached hurricane status within 36 hours of developing. The hurricane was briefly forecast to move toward southern California, but instead, it turned out to sea and lost its status as a tropical cyclone on September 17, before dissipating on September 21. Linda was the fifteenth tropical cyclone, thirteenth named storm, seventh hurricane, and fifth major hurricane of the 1997 Pacific hurricane season. Linda was also the most intense tropical cyclone worldwide in 1997.

While near peak intensity, Hurricane Linda passed near Socorro Island, where it damaged meteorological instruments. The hurricane produced high waves along the southwestern Mexican coastline, forcing the closure of five ports. If Linda had made landfall on southern California as predicted, it would have been the strongest storm to do so since a storm in 1939. Though it did not hit the state, the hurricane produced light to moderate rainfall across the region, causing mudslides and flooding in the San Gorgonio Wilderness; two houses were destroyed and 77 others were damaged, and damage totaled US$3.2 million.

Meteorological history 

The origins of Hurricane Linda are believed to have been in a tropical wave that moved off the coast of Africa on August 24. The wave tracked westward across the Atlantic Ocean and Caribbean Sea without development. An area of convection developed to the west of Panama in the Pacific Ocean on September 6, which is believed to have been related to the tropical wave. The system continued westward, and within three days of entering the basin, a poorly defined circulation formed.

Deep convection and banding features increased, and the depression intensified into a tropical storm early on September 10. Upon being designated, the cyclone was named Linda by the National Hurricane Center (NHC). As upper-level outflow became well-established, the storm began to strengthen quickly. By September 11, an intermittent eye appeared, by which time the NHC estimated that Linda reached hurricane status. The storm began to rapidly intensify; its small eye became well-defined and surrounded by very cold convection. Such intensification met the criterion for explosive deepening, an average hourly pressure decrease of at least .

Shortly after reaching peak intensity, Hurricane Linda passed near Socorro Island as a Category 5 hurricane. Around that time, tropical cyclone forecast models suggested that the hurricane would turn toward southern California due to an approaching upper-level trough. Had Linda struck the state, it would have been much weaker at that time, possibly moving ashore as a tropical storm. Instead, Hurricane Linda turned west-northwestward away from land in response to a building ridge to the north of the hurricane. Despite remaining away from land, moisture from the storm reached southern California to produce rainfall. On September 14, the Hurricane Hunters and airplanes from National Oceanic and Atmospheric Administration investigated the hurricane to provide better data on the powerful hurricane. Hurricane Linda quickly deteriorated as it tracked toward cooler waters, weakening to tropical storm status on September 15. Linda no longer met the criteria for a tropical cyclone by September 18, although its remnant circulation persisted for a few more days before dissipating.

The 1997 season was affected by the 1997–98 El Niño event, which brought warmer than normal water temperatures and contributed to the high intensity of several storms. Hurricane Linda occurred about a month after the similarly powerful Hurricane Guillermo, which also reached Category 5 status. The passage of Linda cooled the waters in the region, causing Hurricane Nora to weaken when it passed through the area on September 21.

Preparations and impact 

Although the eye of Hurricane Linda did not make landfall, the hurricane passed near Socorro Island while near peak intensity. The hurricane cut power to wind and pressure instruments. A station on the island recorded a pressure of  before it stopped producing data. No tropical cyclone warnings or watches were issued for the hurricane. However, the threat for high tides and strong winds in Mexico prompted officials to issue coastal flood warnings and to close five ports.

When Linda was predicted to turn towards the northeast, it was forecast to move ashore in Southern California as a weak tropical storm, which would have made Linda the first to do so since a tropical storm in 1939. The Oxnard, California National Weather Service office issued public information and special weather statements that discussed the possible impact of Linda on southern California. The advisories mentioned forecasting uncertainty, and advised the media not to exaggerate the storm. The office noted a threat for significant rainfall—possibly causing flash flooding—as well as high surf. To prepare for possible flooding, workers cleaned storm drains and prepared sandbags for coastal properties.

Although the storm did not make the turn,  waves reached southern California. In Newport Beach, a wave swept five people off a jetty and carried them  out to sea, although all were rescued by a passing boat. Moisture from the hurricane moved across the state, producing heavy rainfall and golfball-sized hail. The rainfall caused severe flooding and mudslides which destroyed two houses, damaged 77 others, and inflicted $3.2 million in damage (1997 USD). San Diego recorded  of rain, the first measurable precipitation in 164 days; this tied the record for the longest duration without rainfall at the station, previously set in 1915 and 1924.

Records 
Until Hurricane Patricia of 2015, Linda was also believed to have been the strongest since overall records began in the basin in 1949. Since no observations recorded the pressure during Linda's peak, its peak intensity was estimated. As such, Ava remained the strongest directly measured hurricane in the basin at the time.

See also 

 Other tropical cyclones named Linda
 List of California hurricanes
 List of Pacific hurricanes
 Timeline of the 1997 Pacific hurricane season

References 

Linda
Linda (1997)
Linda (1997)
Linda (1997)
1997 in California
1997 in Mexico
Hurricanes in Baja California
Hurricanes in the Revillagigedo Islands